The Current Secretary of the department is Mr.Zulfiqar Ali Shah (BPS-20) an officer of EX-PCS Sindh, while the Minister is Azra Puecho, the sister of Asif Ali Zardari. The Districts are Looked after By DHOs (District Health Officers) that are of BPS-20 who they report to The Director (BPS-20) of the City. The Hospitals are run by Medical Superintendents (MS) of BPS-20. All of them report to the DG Health Sindh BPS-20 (Director-General Health Sindh BPS-20) who is the Highest and the most Powerful Officer after the Secretary Health. The DG Health Office Sindh is regarded as one of the most prestigious and the most important offices in the History of Pakistan. It has always been an important office since the Creation of Pakistan (1947). The DG Health is equal to the Secretary Health himself. The Chief Secretary himself appoints the DG Health in-consultation with the Chief Minister ; This shows that the Secretary Health is not powerful enough to appoint the DG Health but the Chief Secretary himself appoints the DG Health as it is a post that is equivalent to the Secretary of the Department. Also the Removal-and-Appointment Power of the DG Health also belongs to the Chief Minister Sindh. The current DG Health is Dr.Juman Bahoto who has a service of nearly 30 years as a Medical Officer (BPS-17) to Senior Medical Officer (BPS-18) to Chief Medical Officer (BPS-19) to DHO (BPS-20) and Director (BPS-20) and MS Civil Hospital (BPS-20) to the DG Health (BPS-20).
 
Side-Posts include:-
 
1.Additional District Health Officers (BPS-19) [Preventive,Curative and Plannig and Development].They are 3 officers for each district and assist the DHO in running the District.
 
2. Additional Medical Superintendents (BPS-19). They assist the MS in running the hospital.
 
3. Additional Directors. They assist the Director to run the Health-related affairs of the city. They are of (BPS-19) and (BPS-20).
 
4. Director NICVD (BPS-20).
 
5. EPI Project Director (BPS-20).
 
6. Secretary Sindh Blood Transfusion Authority (BPS-20).
 
7. Focal Persons on Smoking, Polio and various others programs (BPS-19) or (BPS-20).
 
8. Heads of the Departments in a hospital (BPS-19) to (BPS-20).
 
9. Physiotherapists (BPS-17 to BPS-20).They become Chief Physiotherapists when they come in (BPS-20).

10. Radiologists (X-Ray Men)

11. Nursing Superintendents and Director Nursing.

The Health Officials, DHO and MS and the Director are in 24 hours contact with the Deputy Commissioner of their respective districts and the Commissioner of their city. They discuss with the Commissoner all the Health-Related matters of their districts or cities.

Major Hospitals of Sindh:-

1. Civil Hospital

2. Sindh Government Qatar Hospital

3. Sindh Government 50 Bedded Hospital

4. Sindh Government Hospital Korangi No.5

5. Sindh Government Hospital Liaquatabad

 
Sindh Health Department Portal </ref>

See also
 Ministry of National Health Services Regulation and Coordination
 Health care in Pakistan
 Health care in Karachi
 Punjab Health Department
 Ministry of Health Balochistan

External links
 Government of Sindh

References

Departments of Government of Sindh
Medical and health organisations based in Pakistan
Sindh